Giovanni Battista Rezzonico (1 June 1740 – 23 February 1785) was an Italian cardinal of the Catholic Church.

He was born in Venice, Italy. He was the nephew of Pope Clement XIII (Carlo della Torre di Rezzonico or Carlo Rezzonico Senior) (1602–1680). His brother Carlo (1724–1799) was also a cardinal and Camerlengo of the Sacred College of Cardinals from 1769 to 1799. On 10 September 1770, he was named a cardinal by Clement XIV and installed on 12 December 1770. He died as Cardinal-Deacon of San Nicola in Carcere. He participated in the 1774–1775 papal conclave.

In the 1760s, he engaged Giovanni Battista Piranesi to enhance the structure of Rome's Santa Maria del Priorato Church and its plaza, providing both with new decoration.

References

1719 births
1785 deaths
Republic of Venice clergy
18th-century Italian cardinals